The 5th Secretariat of the Communist Party of Cuba (PCC) was elected on 4 July 2006 by the 5th Plenary Session of the 5th Central Committee.

Officers

Members

Changes

References

Specific

Bibliography
Articles and journals:
 

5th Secretariat of the Communist Party of Cuba
2006 establishments in Cuba
2011 disestablishments in Cuba